Lavasan-e Bozorg Rural District is in Lavasanat District of Shemiranat County, Tehran province, Iran. At the National Census of 2006, its population was 3,873 in 1,111 households. There were 3,752 inhabitants in 1,217 households at the following census of 2011. At the most recent census of 2016, the population of the rural district was 6,034 in 2,045 households. The largest of its 16 villages was Niknam Deh, with 3,441 people.

References 

Shemiranat County

Rural Districts of Tehran Province

Populated places in Tehran Province

Populated places in Shemiranat County